Since 1968, Hawaii has required a statewide vote for all constitutional amendments voted on by the legislature.

Background 
Hawaii has not historically had a statewide system for citizens to place initiatives on the ballot. In 1907, while it was still a territory, the Democratic Party of Hawaii passed a resolution supporting an initiative system, but when Hawaii became a state no system was included in the Constitution of Hawaii. At the 1968 Constitutional Convention, a initiative & referendum (I&R) system was proposed but was shot down by the committee after less than thirty minutes of deliberation. Efforts were revived during the 1978 Constitutional Convention, spearheaded by State Senator Mary George and the "Citizens Con Con Monitors." This effort was opposed by several workers unions, including the United Public Workers and the Hawaii Government Employees Association, who claimed that "initiative, referendum, and recall would be dominated by emotion rather than reason." While supporters of I&R were successful in bringing the proposal to a vote at the convention, it was ultimately rejected. Since that time, various other efforts have been undertaken by activists to limited successwhile some counties and cities have adopted I&R, the state legislature has adopted an attitude described by the Initiative & Referendum Institute as "openly hostile."

Types of ballot measures 
The only form of ballot measure permitted in Hawaii are legislatively referred constitutional amendments, which are changes to the Constitution of Hawaii proposed by the Hawaiian Government. Article XVII of the Constitution of Hawaii provides for two means by which measures can be placed on the ballot:

 Measures can be placed on the ballot by the Hawaii State Legislature passing a constitutional amendment. Constitutional amendments will not go into effect until after approved by a vote of the people (Article XVII, Section 3).
 Measures can be placed on the ballot by a constitutional convention, which itself must be approved by a ballot measure placed by the legislature (Article XVII, Sections 1-2).

Constitutional amendments passed via ballot measures are unable to be vetoed by the Governor.

1968—1999

1968

1970

1972

1974

1976

1978

1980

1982

1984

1986

1988

1990

1992

1994

1996

1998

2000—

2000

2002

2004

2006

2008

2010

2012

2014

2016

2018

See also 

 Elections in Hawaii
 Initiatives and referendums in the United States

Notes

References 

Lists of referendums
Politics of Hawaii
Hawaii elections